Geoffrey Zakarian (born July 25, 1959) is an American chef, restaurateur, television personality and author.  He is the executive chef of several restaurants in New York City, Atlantic City and Miami. He is featured on several television programs on the Food Network, including Chopped and The Next Iron Chef on which, in 2011, he won the right to join Iron Chef America.

Early life and education
Zakarian was born July 25, 1959, in Worcester, Massachusetts, to an Armenian-American father, musician George Zakarian, and a Polish-American mother, Viola (née Hekowicz). He has a sister, Virginia, and brother, George. He graduated from Burncoat High School in 1977. He earned a degree in economics from Worcester State University, and then went to France, where he decided to be a chef.

He began his culinary career with an associate degree from the Culinary Institute of America in Hyde Park, New York. As an apprentice chef, he began his work under chef Daniel Boulud at Le Cirque, where he was named "Chef de Cuisine" from 1982 to 1987.

Career
In 1990, he became the executive chef at 44, a restaurant described by The New York Times as "trendy" and "chic", located at the Royalton Hotel in midtown Manhattan. William Grimes, also of The New York Times, described Zakarian as "the reason that 44 in the Royalton Hotel was always a lot better than it needed to be" in 2001. Previously, in 1992, 44 had received only two stars from The New York Times columnist Bryan Miller.

In 1996, he was hired to oversee Old Navy's ill-fated coffee bar and coffee cart division with David Brody of Z100 WHTZ. He then went on to work for the Blue Door of the Delano Hotel in South Beach, Miami. In 1998, he became the executive chef at Patroon in Manhattan, which was awarded three stars (excellent) by New York Times critic Ruth Reichl. In the spring of 2000, Zakarian worked with Alain Passard, a renowned French chef at the three-Michelin star restaurant Arpège in Paris.

His style is described as "modern" with roots in French cuisine, or as he describes it, "dynamic American". Zakarian owned two restaurants, Town and Country, both of which are in Manhattan. They have been rated with three stars by The New York Times. His restaurant Town was located on the East Side of Midtown Manhattan in the Chambers Hotel and opened in Spring 2001 but closed in 2009. Country is located in the Carlton Hotel near Madison Square Park and opened in 2005. The restaurant has earned a Michelin Star. Zakarian is now a consultant at the Water Club in Atlantic City and executive chef at the Lamb's Club in New York City. The Lambs Club restaurant is not connected in any way to the historical theatre club The Lambs (known as The Lambs Club since 1874).

In the spring of 2006, Zakarian released his first book, Geoffrey Zakarian's Town / Country. It was quoted as being "one of the best of 2006" by The New York Times columnist Amanda Hesser. The book features 150 recipes for family, friends and "Life Around the Table".

He is Chairman of the City Harvest Food Council, a food rescue organization dedicated to fighting hunger in New York City.

Legal issues
In spring 2011, Zakarian filed for personal bankruptcy in response to a class action lawsuit against him by his former employees. The employees alleged he violated labor laws and sued for back pay. Two of Zakarian's partners in the related restaurant supported the workers' claims, but Zakarian's publicist denied the claims. The matter was settled out of court.

In July 2015, Zakarian withdrew from a planned American-style concept restaurant called The National in the Trump International Hotel Washington, D.C. in the wake of controversial comments made by Donald Trump about undocumented immigrants. Trump's statements "do not in any way align with my personal core values", Zakarian said. "We are a nation built from immigrants, my family included." Zakarian was expected to lose a $500,000 lease deposit. Trump sued Zakarian in August 2015 for a sum "in excess of $10 million" for lost rent and other damages. The matter was settled out of court in April 2017.

Television
He has appeared numerous times on Food Network's Chopped series as a judge with fellow restaurateurs Scott Conant, Chris Santos, Aarón Sánchez, Amanda Freitag, Marcus Samuelsson, Marc Murphy, Maneet Chauhan and Alex Guarnaschelli since the show began, and has also appeared in the Food Network's series 24 Hour Restaurant Battle, also as a judge. He has also been on Top Chef as a judge and has appeared in Hell's Kitchen. Zakarian competed as well as a challenger on Iron Chef America in May 2010 where he faced Masaharu Morimoto and lost with a score of 57 to 43. Zakarian was named the winner of The Next Iron Chef in December 2011, defeating Elizabeth Falkner in the season finale. In January 2014, Zakarian became a co-host on the Food Network's series The Kitchen along with Jeff Mauro, Katie Lee, Marcela Valladolid and Sunny Anderson. Zakarian has also appeared on Cutthroat Kitchen as a judge ("Well, Hot Clam!") and contestant ("Judging Judges"). In 2016, he began hosting the Food Network series Cooks vs. Cons, where judges try to determine if a winning dish was done by a professional chef or a home cook.

Personal life
Zakarian married Margaret Anne Williams, a marketing executive, in 2005. They have two daughters, Anna and Madeline, and one son, George. He was previously married to Heather Karaman for approximately ten years.

See also
Iron Chef America

References

External links

1959 births
Living people
American people of Armenian descent
American restaurateurs
American television chefs
American male chefs
American libertarians
Food Network chefs
Writers from Worcester, Massachusetts
American people of Polish descent
Worcester State University alumni
Culinary Institute of America Hyde Park alumni
Reality cooking competition winners